Haplothrips is a genus of thrips in the family Phlaeothripidae. It is found worldwide and contains about 240 extant species.

Description 
Thrips of this genus are medium-sized with one pair of 8-segmented antennae, three pairs of legs and usually two pairs of well-developed wings (macropterous). The head has a short mouth cone and a pair of deeply retracted maxillary stylets. The forewings are distinctly constricted in the middle and (in subgenus Haplothrips) have duplicated cilia. The second through to the seventh abdominal tergites each have two pairs of sigmoid wing-retaining setae. In males, the ninth abdominal tergite has setae S2 short and stout, while the eight abdominal sternite usually has no pore plate. The male of H. dissociatus is unusual in having a small pore plate.

Some of the aforementioned features, such as the forewing constriction, are shared by other Haplothripini.

Ecology 
Haplothrips mostly feed and breed in flowers. The northern hemisphere species prefer flowers of Asteraceae and Poaceae, while the Australian species feed on a range of families. Some species are instead associated with leaves. 

Other Haplothrips are predatory. Examples are H. faurei and H. victoriensis, which are used in biological control of mites.

The Hawaiian species H. rosai is believed to feed on fungi.

Pests 
Haplothrips aculeatus and H. ganglbaueri are pests of millet, while unspecified Haplothrips species are pests of cashew.

Selected species
 Haplothrips aculeatus (Fabricius, 1803)
 Haplothrips articulosus Bagnall, 1926
 Haplothrips cerealis Priesner, 1939
 Haplothrips clarisetis Priesner, 1930
 Haplothrips distinguendus Uzel, 1895
 Haplothrips fuliginosus Schille, 1912
 Haplothrips gowdeyi (Franklin, 1908)
 Haplothrips graminis Hood, 1912
 Haplothrips habermani Strassen, 1964
 Haplothrips halophilus Hood, 1915
 Haplothrips herajius Minaei & Aleosfoor, 2013
 Haplothrips kurdjumovi (Karny, 1913)
 Haplothrips leucanthemi (Schrank, 1781)
 Haplothrips malifloris Hood, 1916
 Haplothrips minutus (Uzel, 1895)
 Haplothrips nigricornis Bagnall, 1910
 Haplothrips nubilipennis Hood, 1914
 Haplothrips preeri Hood, 1939
 Haplothrips rectipennis Hood, 1927
 Haplothrips reuteri (Karny, 1907)
 Haplothrips robustus Bagnall, 1918
 Haplothrips ruber (Moulton, 1911)
 Haplothrips setiger Priesner, 1921
 Haplothrips shacklefordi Moulton, 1927
 Haplothrips stactices (Haliday, 1836)
 Haplothrips subterraneus Crawford, 1938
 Haplothrips verbasci (Osborn, 1897)
 Haplothrips xanthocrepis Hood, 1940

References

Identification 

Australian thrips of the Haplothrips lineage (Insecta: Thysanoptera) (includes key to Australian Haplothrips)
Identification of Haplothrips species from Malesia (Thysanoptera, Phlaeothripinae)
New Neotropical Haplothripini (Thysanoptera: Phlaeothripidae) with a key to Central and South American genera (includes key to Neotropical Haplothrips)

External links
 Encyclopedia of Life entry
 Haplothrips - an overview | ScienceDirect Topics

Thrips genera
Phlaeothripidae